The 2024 United States House of Representatives elections in Ohio will be held on November 5, 2024, to elect the fifteen U.S. representatives from the State of Ohio, one from each of the state's congressional districts. The elections will coincide with the 2024 U.S. presidential election, as well as other elections to the House of Representatives, elections to the United States Senate, and various state and local elections.

During the 2020 redistricting cycle, the Ohio State Supreme Court ruled that the congressional district maps enacted by the Ohio Redistricting Commission were illegal gerrymanders that unduly favored Republicans, violating the Constitution of Ohio. Nevertheless, the 2022 elections took place using those districts as the Court determined that it did not have the authority to impose a new map itself. The legality of the districts awaits review by the Supreme Court of the United States and, depending on how it decides, there is a possibility the maps may be redrawn prior to the 2024 elections.

District 1

The 1st district is based in the city of Cincinnati, stretching northward to Warren County. The incumbent is Democrat Greg Landsman, who flipped the district and was elected with 52.5% of the vote in 2022.

Democratic primary

Candidates

Potential
Greg Landsman, incumbent U.S. Representative

Republican primary

Candidates

Declined
Steve Chabot, former U.S. Representative

General election

Predictions

District 9

The 9th district is based in Northwest Ohio, including Toledo and the western Lake Erie coast. The incumbent is Democrat Marcy Kaptur, who was reelected with 56.5% of the vote in 2022.

Democratic primary

Candidates

Potential
Marcy Kaptur, incumbent U.S. Representative

Republican primary

Candidates

Publicly expressed interest
J.R. Majewski, project manager, U.S. Army veteran, and nominee in 2022

Potential
Theresa Gavarone, state senator and candidate in 2022
Derek Merrin, state representative

General election

Predictions

District 13

The 13th district includes most of the Akron-Canton population corridor, taking in all of Summit County and parts of Portage and Stark Counties. The incumbent is Democrat Emilia Sykes, who was elected with 52.4% of the vote in 2022.

Democratic primary

Candidates

Potential
Emilia Sykes, incumbent U.S. Representative

Republican primary

Candidates

Declared
Madison Gesiotto Gilbert, lawyer, former Miss Ohio USA, and nominee in 2022

General election

Predictions

References

2024
Ohio
United States House of Representatives